The MLS on NBC is the branding used for broadcasts of Major League Soccer (MLS) games produced by NBC Sports, the sports division of the NBC television network in the United States, and broadcast on NBC and NBCSN from 2012 to 2014.

Contract overview
On January 5, 2012, NBC Sports signed a three-year contract with Major League Soccer to nationally televise 40 matches per year, which would primarily air on the NBC Sports Network (now NBCSN), beginning with the 2012 season. All NBC telecasts included pre-game and post-game coverage, with the network intending to promote its games during broadcasts of its other major sports properties, such as the Olympics. More specifically as part of the new deal, NBC would carry three regular season and two playoff matches (the first time since 2002 that that many MLS games were to be broadcast on English-language network television), as well as 38 regular season and three playoff matches on sister channel NBCSN; both networks also aired matches featuring the United States men's national soccer team (with two games airing on each network).

NBC Sports took over the Major League Soccer rights from Fox Soccer and Fox Deportes. Previous deals with U.S. partners ESPN, ESPN2, ESPN Deportes and Galavisión continued in 2012, as did with Canadian partners TSN, TSN2 and GolTV.

Performance
NBC Sports' ratings for MLS improved greatly due to the increased presence of NBCSN (fueled by their NHL television package), with average ratings for the games jumping 122% for the inaugural season of the contract in 2012. Yet still, several games ranked at or near the bottom of the ratings among sporting event and entertainment telecasts, whereas ESPN's MLS coverage – which was railed by fans as being inferior to NBC's – had higher viewership, attributed to the greater availability of ESPN and ESPN2 nationally.

NBC and NBCSN's MLS telecasts during the 2013 season averaged 115,000 viewers per game, a steep drop from 2012. Looking to capitalize on further soccer opportunities, NBC Sports acquired the rights to the Premier League from Fox Soccer in 2012, in time for the 2013–14 Premier League season. Speculation abounded on if MLS was to be treated by the sports division secondarily to the Premier League, which has a greater U.S. audience than the domestic league, placing MLS' future with NBC in doubt.

In 2014, negotiations broke down between NBC and MLS on a new television contract. The league instead signed an agreement with Fox Sports to serve as its U.S. broadcast partner, beginning with the 2015 season in a shared rights deal with ESPN.

NBC also operates a blog, ProSoccerTalk, which ran news headlines from Major League Soccer and other international soccer leagues. With NBC acquiring the broadcast television rights to the Premier League in 2013, significantly more coverage of the English top-flight was added to the site.

On-air staff

Commentators

 Ron Burke – alternate studio host
 JP Dellacamera – alternate play-by-play
 Brian Dunseth – alternate color commentator
 Robbie Earle – alternate color commentator
 Robbie Mustoe – alternate color commentator
 Brent Harris – alternate studio host
 Kyle Martino – lead color commentator
 John Strong – lead play-by-play 
 Russ Thaler – lead studio host

See also
 Major League Soccer on television
 Premier League on NBC

References

External links
MLS News: Cody Westheimer Composes Theme Music for Major League Soccer on NBC
For NBC the script is twofold: Tell the story of Major League Soccer while building the stature of its NBC Sports Network.
Magic's 'Announcement' soars; NBC begins its MLS coverage
Partnership Looks Bright For MLS And NBC 
NBC Thinking Outside the Booth with Their MLS Soccer Coverage
NBC Sports Group Combines To Show Over 40 MLS Games in 2012
NBC Sports Group Taps Arlo White To Call MLS Games

2012 American television series debuts
2014 American television series endings
NBC
NBC Sports
NBCSN shows
NBC original programming
Sports telecast series